The Southern Region Women's Football League is at the fifth and sixth levels of the English women's football pyramid, with the seven other Regional Leagues – Eastern, London & SE, South West, West Midlands, East Midlands, North East and North West.

The Southern Region Women's Football League promotes teams directly into the FA Women's National League Division 1 South West, and lies above the Hampshire Women's League and Thames Valley Women's Football League in the pyramid. The pyramid structure was founded in 1998.

Below the Premier Division, the two Division Ones are split geographically with Division One East and Division One West.

The 2019/20 season was expunged due to the 2020 COVID-19 pandemic.

2022-23 season 
The current table standings:

Teams

Premier Division

Division One North

Division One South

External links
Southern Region Women's Football League: The FA Full-Time
 (defunct)

References

5